Joel Malcolm Rapp (May 22, 1934 – September 15, 2021) was an American writer and director who worked extensively in film and television.

Life and career
Rapp was born in New York, and grew up in Beverly Hills, California. He was the son of Philip Rapp, and was the older brother of Paul Rapp, a production manager for film and television.

In the late 1950s, Rapp worked with producer Roger Corman as a director on the films High School Big Shot and Battle of Blood Island. He also wrote for numerous sitcoms including McHale's Navy, Bewitched, and Green Acres.

Rapp was a passionate gardener, and was nicknamed "Mr. Mother Earth, Plant Man to the Stars". He authored 14 books on gardening, and was the gardener for Live with Regis and Kathie Lee.

He died in Beverly Hills on September 15, 2021, at the age of 87. He was survived by his wife, brother and two children.

Selected credits

Film
High School Big Shot (1959) 
Battle of Blood Island (1960)

Television
Topper
Highway Patrol
Lassie
Peter Loves Mary
The Donna Reed Show
McHale's Navy
The Patty Duke Show
Bewitched
Gilligan's Island

References

External links

  as Lynn & Joel Rapp

1934 births
2021 deaths
American film directors
American male screenwriters
American television writers
American male television writers
Screenwriters from New York (state)
Writers from New York City